ABBA: The Tour, later also labelled ABBA in Concert and ABBA: North American and European Tour 1979, was the third concert tour by the Swedish pop group, ABBA. Primarily visiting North America, Europe and Asia during 1979–1980, the tour supported the group's sixth studio album, Voulez-Vous.  The tour opened in Edmonton, Alberta, Canada, on September 13, 1979, and the tour closed in Tokyo, Japan on March 27, 1980, having performed 52 shows in 40 cities across 13 countries. As it was the group's final tour before unofficially disbanding in late 1982, it included the largest catalogue of hit songs performed on a tour.

Background

Since forming in 1972, the group had only performed sporadically over eight years. For many years, the group had refused to tour in the USA because they wanted to be the headliner and not the opening act. Pressured to tour by their record company, the group had performed a brief tour in Europe and Australia in the summer of 1977. Upon the release of their sixth album, the group decided to tour North America for one month. Benny Andersson stated that the decision to tour was based on the need for the group to become more "present" to North American audiences. He further felt that the media would not consider ABBA to be a "real" group if they had not toured.

In January 1979, ABBA performed alongside Donna Summer the Bee Gees, Olivia Newton-John and Earth, Wind & Fire at the "A Gift of Song—Music for UNICEF Concert" at the United Nations General Assembly in New York City. The concert benefited the United Nations Children's Fund. Shortly after, it was revealed that members Björn Ulvaeus and Agnetha Fältskog had been separated for several months. Despite this, Agnetha assured the media that the group was united, stating, "Everyone feels very good at the moment. We are working well together and we still have something to give".

The tour was officially announced by WEA in May 1979, beginning in Canada and the United States before venturing into Europe. While promoting the album, the quartet began rehearsals for the tour in June 1979 at the Stockholm Concert Hall in Stockholm, Sweden. Agnetha and Anni-Frid began taking private vocal lessons while Benny and Björn organized the tour. In the United States, the tour was heavily promoted by various media outlets including Billboard magazine, where a 50-page mini-magazine about ABBA was included in its September 8, 1979, issue. The magazine provided a history of the group as well as outlining their success in over 40 countries worldwide. It also provided details of the upcoming tour, as well as personal interviews with each member of the quartet. During one of the interviews, Andersson and Ulvaeus remarked how important the tour was to the group, especially touring in new territory. They stated:"To us, the U.S. is mainly a challenge. The whole tour to us is a great challenge. Tonight, the audience was great and everything went smoothly. But it was a very strange feeling when we have not toured in 2 1/2 years. You don't have the self confidence that most artists have that tour a lot and you don't know until you're up there, until you meet the audience face-to-face, whether it's going to work or not…"

Nevertheless, the last scheduled ABBA concert in the United States in Washington, D.C. on October 4, was cancelled due to Fältskog's emotional distress suffered during the flight from New York to Boston, when the group's private plane was subjected to extreme weather conditions and was unable to land for an extended period.

Rehearsals of the tour continued when ABBA made a surprise appearance at a nightclub in Stockholm as a sneak peek for the upcoming tour. Andersson felt they needed to do this in order to build the self-confidence required to perform onstage in front of large audiences.

The group returned to rehearsals in August 1979 after promotions in the United States and Mexico ended. While rehearsing at the Europafilm Studios in Sundbyberg, Andersson and Ulvaeus needed to produce a song to help promote the tour. Together, they wrote Gimme! Gimme! Gimme! (A Man After Midnight).

The staging for the tour was a standard endstage with a blue backdrop with several triangular structures, resembling icebergs. It was on this tour that Fältskog and Lyngstad wore the iconic blue, indigo and violet jumpsuits. The suits were later recreated by Madonna on her Confessions Tour as a tribute to the band.

As the group toured the United States, their film ABBA: The Movie was shown in the city after each concert.

Despite critical acclaim, the band did not plan to tour again. Lyngstad stated that she felt secure onstage whereas Fältskog felt more comfortable in the recording studio. The group disliked the conditions of traveling for the tour, with one plane trip that was very traumatic for Fältskog. Their reactions to touring would later be penned in the song Super Trouper. Many fans speculated the song was a long letter written to Ulvaeus' new lover—shown in the lines: "I was sick and tired of everything // When I called you last night from Glasgow // All I do is eat and sleep and sing // Wishing every show was the last show". However the song shifts viewpoint in the lines: "Facing 20,000 of your friends // How can anyone be so lonely // Part of a success that never ends // Still I'm thinking about you only".

Even though the ABBA members continued their musical careers as solo artists, they did not regroup as ABBA for a concert tour until 2022's ABBA Voyage residency. The 1979 tour is considered to be a classic among ABBA fans; many contemporary artists and ABBA tribute bands have included elements of this tour in their shows.

Set list
 "Gammal Fäbodpsalm" (Instrumental introduction)
 "Voulez-Vous"
 "If It Wasn't for the Nights"
 "As Good as New"
 "Knowing Me, Knowing You"
 "Rock Me"
 "Not Bad at All" (sung by backing singer Tomas Ledin)
 "Chiquitita"
 "Money, Money, Money"
 "I Have a Dream"
 "Gimme! Gimme! Gimme! (A Man After Midnight)"
 "S.O.S."
 "Fernando"
 "The Name of the Game"
 "Eagle"
 "Thank You for the Music"
 "Why Did It Have to Be Me"
 "Intermezzo No. 1" (Instrumental interlude)
 "I'm Still Alive"
 "Summer Night City"
 "Take a Chance on Me"
 "Does Your Mother Know"
 "Hole in Your Soul"
Encore
  "The Way Old Friends Do"
 "Dancing Queen"
 "Waterloo"

Additional notes
 "One Man, One Woman" was performed at Northlands Coliseum in Edmonton, Alberta, Canada.
 "Not Bad at All" was performed by Tomas Ledin and the backing singers.
 "I Have a Dream" was performed along with a local children's choir in each city.
 "I'm Still Alive" was performed by Agnetha Fältskog at the piano.
 "Waterloo" was not included in the setlist until the Anaheim concert. It then disappeared until St. Paul and was performed through the end of the tour in Toronto.

Tour dates

Critical response
Brian Brennan (Calgary Herald) was very impressed with ABBA's stage performance (given the fact that the group had not previously toured in North America) although he felt the concert was very tame compared to the group's popularity stating, "[...] marred by disappointingly poor sound quality, obviously fatal for any band that depends for impact on mastery of studio technology. During the first half, the performers lacked the supercharged vitality and provocative self-assurance normally associated with big-league artists. However, for cool professionalism, assembly-line precision and computer-perfect programming, the show functioned like a machine from start to finish."

Broadcasts and recordings
The tour was showcased in the film, ABBA in Concert. The film captured ABBA's Wembley Arena November, 1979, concerts in London, England. ABBA in Concert originally aired on BBC and NBC television in 1980, then was released on VHS in 1980 and DVD in 2004.

In late 2013, Benny Andersson mentioned in an interview that a "new ABBA live at Wembley" album is on the way.  Benny confirmed on February 6, 2014, on Radio Sweden:  "Universal will release a live album, which is the last concert at Wembley, that we did. Whenever it was. 79?. As it was. Nothing fixed. Just sort of... we mixed it and it will come out later this year".

On June 9, 2014, ABBA's official Facebook and Instagram accounts announced the release of Live at Wembley Arena. The 2 x CD and 3 x vinyl LP set will include Agnetha's performance of "I'm Still Alive" (which was only ever performed on this tour), which will be released commercially for the first time. The next day on June 10, the full track list was revealed. It was released on September 29, September 26 in Australia and September 30 in the U.S. and Canada.

Postage stamp
On October 1, 1983, as part of the World Music Day created by the International Music Council of UNESCO, the Swedish Posten AB released a set of five stamps commemorating music in Sweden.

An image of ABBA, engraved by Czeslaw Slania from a photograph by Anders Hanser at the fourth concert of the tour (Portland Paramount Theatre), was immortalized on the Pop-music stamp in the Posten set.  Other stamps showcased Swedish Classic, Opera, Folk and Jazz performers.

References

ABBA
1979 concert tours
1980 concert tours